Beggar's Holiday is a 1934 American drama film directed by Sam Newfield and starring Hardie Albright, J. Farrell MacDonald and Sally O'Neil. It was produced on Poverty Row as a second feature. Scenes were shot at the Talisman Studios. In Britain it was distributed by Universal Pictures.

Synopsis
The daughter of a tug boat captain loses her job as a taxi dancer. Struggling she meets and falls in love with him, unwittingly knowing that he has been charged with embezzlement and is out on bail. He plans to enjoy two weeks fun with her before skipping the country, but unexpectedly finds that he has fallen in love with her too. He confesses his situation to her and stays in America to face the music. Paroled after a year, he goes straight and gets a job at the wharf.

Cast
 Hardie Albright as Dapper Frank Mason aka Bing
 J. Farrell MacDonald as 	Pop Malloy
 Sally O'Neil as 	Myrt Malloy
 Barbara Barondess as	Flo Evans
 George Grandee as 	Bill Evans
 William Franklin as 	Detective
 Louise Beavers as 	Heliotrope
 James T. Mack as 	Reverend 
 George O'Hanlon as 	Bellhop

References

Bibliography
 Pitts, Michael R. Poverty Row Studios, 1929–1940: An Illustrated History of 55 Independent Film Companies, with a Filmography for Each. McFarland & Company, 2005.

External links

1934 films
American drama films
1934 drama films
1930s English-language films
American black-and-white films
Films directed by Sam Newfield
1930s American films